Jonathan Williams (born June 1, 1961) is a former American football running back. He played for the New England Patriots in 1984.

Raised in Somerville, New Jersey, Williams played football at Somerville High School.

References

1961 births
Living people
Somerville High School (New Jersey) alumni
American football running backs
Penn State Nittany Lions football players
New England Patriots players
Sportspeople from Somerville, New Jersey
Players of American football from New Jersey
Sportspeople from Somerset County, New Jersey